Fotherby Halt was a railway halt on the East Lincolnshire Railway which served the village of Fotherby in Lincolnshire between 1905 and 1961. The station was opened on the site of a previous station named Fotherby Gate House which had closed in 1872. The second station closed in 1961, but the line through it remained open for freight until December 1980.

History
The origins of the station's name lay in the gatehouse constructed in 1847 by contractor John Waring and Sons of Rotherham to control the crossing over Peppin Lane near Fotherby, to the south of which the station lay. It was served by a twice-weekly passenger service restricted to market days. This reduced its patronage to such an extent that it was closed on 28 June 1872, but remained in public timetables until October 1872.

The station was reopened on 11 December 1905 as Fotherby Halt to coincide with the introduction of a motor train service by the Great Northern Railway. It consisted of two low parallel halt platforms to the south of the level crossing; a crossing box (the block section being Ludborough-Louth North) was sited at the northern end of the up platform next to the crossing and opposite Fotherby gatehouse which served as the crossing keeper's cottage. Passenger services called at the station upon request only.

Present day

The halt was demolished by British Rail long before final closure of the line in December 1980 and little remains of it today. The crossing keeper's cottage survives in good condition as a private residence, but the original windows have given way to upvc replacements. The rails remain embedded in the tarmac over Peppin Lane and an old signal stands over the trackbed to the south towards Louth. The gate box was moved to Chappel and Wakes Colne railway station in 1985 as part of the East Anglian Railway Museum.

References

Sources

External links
 Fotherby Halt on navigable O. S. map

Disused railway stations in Lincolnshire
Railway stations in Great Britain closed in 1961
Railway stations in Great Britain opened in 1905
Railway stations in Great Britain closed in 1872
Railway stations in Great Britain opened in 1853
Former Great Northern Railway stations